Khaulia Union is an Union Parishad under Morrelganj Upazila of Bagerhat District in the division of Khulna, Bangladesh. It has an area of 41.44 km2 (16.00 sq mi) and a population of 27,841.

References

Unions of Morrelganj Upazila
Unions of Bagerhat District
Unions of Khulna Division